Clown Ferdinand is a fictional character from a number of Czechoslovak and later East German children TV series and films, played by actor Jiří Vršťala. The character was created by screenwriter Ota Hofman and film director  Jindřich Polák.

Series

Czechoslovak series
 1959 Klaun Ferdinand jede do města (TV film)
 1959 Klaun Ferdinand jede do televize (TV  film)
 1959 Klaun Ferdinand peče dort (TV  film)
 1959 Klaun Ferdinand u moře (TV  film)
 1959 Klaun Ferdinand uklízí (TV  film)
 1963 Klaun Ferdinand a chemie (TV  film)
 1963 Klaun Ferdinand a raketa - Czech children's science fiction film by  Jindřich Polák
 1965 Klaun Ferdinand chce spát (German title: Klaun Faerdinand will schlafen)

East German series
 1969 - Der Weihnachtsmann heißt Willi - (film)
 1978 - Ferdinand, was nun? - (TV)
 1979 - Ferdinand rettet die Sonne - (TV)
 1980 - Ferdinand wird Vater - (TV)
 1981 - Ferdinand sucht den Regenbogen - (TV)
 1983 - Ferdinand im Reich der Töne - (TV)

References

External links
, German TV series

Fictional clowns
Fictional Czech people
Comedy films about clowns
Television shows about clowns
Television in East Germany
Children's film series
Czechoslovak television series